The USC Trojans women's lacrosse team is an NCAA Division I college lacrosse team representing the University of Southern California as part of the Pac-12 Conference. They play their home games at McAlister Field in Los Angeles, California.

Individual career records

Reference:

Individual single-season records

Seasons

Postseason results

The Trojans have appeared in 3 NCAA tournaments. Their postseason record is 4–3.

References